The 1959–60 Sussex County Football League season was the 35th in the history of the competition.

Division 1 remained at sixteen teams and Sidley United was promoted from Division 2. Division 2 was decreased to fifteen teams, as Cuckfield and Hove Town left the league but Horsham YMCA joining, from which the winner would be promoted into Division 1.

Division One
The division featured 16 clubs, 15 which competed in the last season, along with one new club:
Sidley United, promoted from last season's Division Two

League table

Division Two
The division featured 15 clubs, 14 which competed in the last season, along with one new club:
Horsham YMCA

League table

References

1959-60
9